The 1896 Central Michigan Normalites football team represented Central Michigan Normal School, later renamed Central Michigan University, as an independent during the 1896 college football season. Central Michigan was founded in 1892 and fielded its first varsity football team in 1896.  Under head coach Pete McCormick, the first Central Michigan football team compiled a 3–1 record and outscored their four opponents by a combined total of 62 to 22. All four games were played against high school teams.  On October 31, 1896, the Central Michigan football team lost to Alma High School, 14–5, in a game played in Mount Pleasant. On November 21, 1896, Central Michigan defeated Bay City High School by a 14–4 score at Mt. Pleasant.

Schedule

References

Central Michigan
Central Michigan Chippewas football seasons
Central Michigan Normalites football